The 2014 Ivy League men's lacrosse tournament took place May 2 to May 4 at Harvard Stadium in  Cambridge, Massachusetts. Penn defeated Harvard to win the tournament and received the Ivy League 's automatic bid to the 2014 NCAA Division I Men's Lacrosse Championship.

Standings
The top four teams in the Ivy League after the regular season advance to the Ivy League Conference Tournament. Harvard and Cornell finished the regular season with identical 5-1 records and share the league title. Tiebreakers only apply to tournament seeding. The winner of the tournament only receives the league's automatic bid to the NCAA tournament. League champion is determined only by regular season results.

Schedule

All-Tournament
Matt Donovan, Cornell

Conrad Oberbeck, Yale

Brian Fischer, Harvard

Danny Feeney, Penn

Daniel Eipp, Harvard

Zack Losco, Penn

Devin Dwyer, Harvard

Nick Doktor, Penn

Brian Feeney, Penn

Peter Schwartz, Harvard

Most Outstanding Player

Zack Losco, Penn

References

https://web.archive.org/web/20150908050833/http://ivyleaguesports.com/sports/mlax/2013-14/schedule 2015-05-03.

https://web.archive.org/web/20150922061637/http://ivyleaguesports.com/championships/mlax/2013-14/championship_info Retrieved 2015-05-03.

https://web.archive.org/web/20150402035001/http://www.ivyleaguesports.com/sports/mlax/2013-14/standings Retrieved 2015-05-03.

https://web.archive.org/web/20150908051141/http://ivyleaguesports.com/sports/mlax/2013-14/releases/Penn_Wins_Mens_Lacrosse_Tournament_Title Retrieved 2015-05-03.

2014 in lacrosse
Ivy League Men's Lacrosse